Bifrenaria clavigera is a species of orchid.

clavigera